Alexander Georgiyevich Ananenkov (born May 13, 1952 in Sterlitamak, Bashkir ASSR, Russian SFSR, Soviet Union) is a Russian businessman.

For ten years between 2001 and 2011 he was a deputy head of the management committee of Gazprom for production. as well as a shareholder of the Russian natural gas company.

On December 30, 2011, Ananenkov was dismissed by Gazprom and replaced by Vitaly Markelov.

References

Russian energy industry businesspeople
1952 births
Living people
Gazprom people